Michael A. Slyziuk (September 18, 1918 – October 10, 2003) was the Skip on the Detroit CC curling team (from Detroit, Michigan, United States) during the 1963 World Curling Championships known as the Scotch Cup, where United States team finished with bronze medals.

After serving in the Canadian Army, he moved to Windsor, Ontario in 1942. He joined the Detroit Curling Club in 1948 and served as its President in 1969-70. An active curler for over 35 years, he was U.S. National Champion in 1958 and 1963, attending the Nationals ten times.

In 1990 he was inducted to United States Curling Hall of Fame.

Personal life
Slyziuk was employed as a businessman. He also played baseball in his youth. He was married to Rose Slyziuk. Later in life he lived in Sun City, Florida and Denver, Colorado.

References

External links
 
 
 

1918 births
2003 deaths
American male curlers
American curling champions
Canadian emigrants to the United States
Curlers from Manitoba
Curlers from Ontario
Canadian Army personnel
Sportspeople from Windsor, Ontario
Sportspeople from Denver
Sportspeople from Hillsborough County, Florida
People from Parkland Region, Manitoba
Canadian people of Ukrainian descent
American people of Ukrainian descent